We Are Violent People by Nature is the fifth album by deathcore band I Declare War. It is the first album to feature John Winters on guitar and the only album to feature Jacob Hansen on guitar, Gordon McPherson on bass, and Colin Bradford on drums.

Track listing

Personnel
I Declare War
Jamie Hanks - vocals
Jacob Hansen - guitars
John Winters - guitars
Gordon McPherson - bass
Colin Bradford - drums
Production
Produced by BJ Sampson
Mixed and mastered by Stephan Hawkes
Layout by Sam Shepard
A&R, layout by Mike Milford

2014 albums
I Declare War (band) albums